Laurice Ilagan Guillen-Feleo (born January 31, 1947) is a Filipino actress, film and television director, and college professor.

Early life and acting career
Guillen studied at St. Theresa's College, Cebu City, earned an AB English degree before finishing an MA in Communication at Ateneo de Manila University, where she taught at the college level. She took a television production course under Nestor Torre, in 1967. She then began work as an actress, starring in productions of Mrs. Warren's Profession, before crossing over to film and television work, playing a seductress in Tinimbang Ka Ngunit Kulang, and Corazon Aquino in the drama A Dangerous Life.

In 2009, she accepted a role in the indie film Karera, her first role in an independent production. Other credits include such notable films as Tinimbang ka Ngunit Kulang (1974), Lunes, Martes ... (1975), Inay (1977); Init (1978); Ina, Kapatid, Anak (1979), Moral (1982); Nagalit ang Buwan sa haba ng Gabi (1983); and Sister Stella L (1984).

However, it was on television that she became a household name when she joined the cast of Flor de Luna in 1978 as Jo Alicante, Flor de Luna's temperamental step mother. She went on to portray the role until the mid-1980s when the show folded.

Directing career
A protégé of Lino Brocka, Guillen began her first major work as a director with Kasal in 1979, followed by Kung Ako'y Iiwan Mo in 1980. In 1981, she made Salome for Bancom Audiovision with Gina Alajar in the lead, establishing herself as director with depth and substance. The movie was a critical success, and she won Best Director at the Gawad Urian. The same film was shown at the Toronto International Film Festival and described as "the kind of cinematic discovery that single-handedly justifies the festival's existence". Ipagpatawad Mo was also directed by Guillen, as was Dahil Mahal Kita: The Dolzura Cortez Story in 1993, before her retirement from filmmaking.

Dedicating herself to the Marian movement, Guillen made pilgrimages to churches and cathedrals throughout the Philippines with her husband, believing that Mary had called on her to experience a spiritual renewal. By 1998 she was thinking about returning to filmmaking, and following a good reception of Ipagpatawad Mo by a group of priests, who encouraged her to back into filmmaking, along with an appearance on Kris Aquino's talk show, she did so.

Her first new production was Tanging Yaman, released in 2001, which won several awards at the Metro Manila Film Festival. Following 2002's American Adobo, Guillen directed Santa Santita in 2004, which represented the Philippines at the Bangkok International Film Festival.

In 2006, she was awarded the Gawad Tanglaw ng Lahi by Ateneo de Manila University for services to the Arts. In 2009 she directed I Love You Goodbye, following it up with Sa 'yo Lamang in 2010, starring Lorna Tolentino. As well as working as a director, Guillen also served as Chief Executive Officer of the Film Development Council of the Philippines, before her appointment was unexpectedly not renewed in 2005. After breaking away from the previous Filipino directors guild due to a desire for reform, Guillen helped found the Directors Guild of the Philippines, resigning on March 26, 2001, due to her feeling that this reform had not been carried out.

Personal life
Guillen was married to Johnny Delgado, with whom she had two daughters, her youngest being actress Ina Feleo. He died of lymphoma in November 2009. Guillen is the cousin of former Piddig, Ilocos Norte mayor turned NIA acting administrator Eduardo Guillen.

Filmography

Television

Film

Television director

Film director

Awards

References

External links

1947 births
Living people
Ateneo de Manila University alumni
Filipino film directors
Filipino television directors
Filipino women film directors
Filipino television actresses
Filipino people of Spanish descent
People from Butuan
Women television directors
GMA Network (company) people
ABS-CBN personalities
GMA Network personalities